Lusi is an Austronesian language of New Britain. Kaliai is a dialect.

References

Ngero languages
Languages of West New Britain Province